The Armitage-Halsted District is a historic district in the Lincoln Park community area of Chicago, Illinois, United States.  The district was built between 1870 and 1930 by various architects. It was designated a Chicago Landmark on February 5, 2003.

References

Historic districts in Chicago
North Side, Chicago
Chicago Landmarks